Halifax County-Dartmouth was a provincial electoral district in Nova Scotia, Canada, that elected one member to the Nova Scotia House of Assembly. It was created in 1956 from portions of the former Halifax County district and existed until 1967, at which point the district was reformed into Dartmouth North and Dartmouth South.

Members of the Legislative Assembly 
Halifax County-Dartmouth elected the following members to the Legislative Assembly:

Election results

1956 general election

1960 general election

1963 general election

References

Former provincial electoral districts of Nova Scotia